Newsholme is a civil parish in Ribble Valley, Lancashire, England.  It contains eight listed buildings that are recorded in the National Heritage List for England.  All of the listed buildings are designated at Grade II, the lowest of the three grades, which is applied to "buildings of national importance and special interest".  Apart from the village of Newsholme, the parish is entirely rural.  The listed buildings consist of four farmhouses, a former toll house, and two milestones.

Buildings

References

Citations

Sources

Lists of listed buildings in Lancashire
Buildings and structures in Ribble Valley